Ganeshpur, Nepal  is a Village Development Committee in Syangja District in the Gandaki Zone of central Nepal. At the time of the 1991 Nepal census it had a population of 3265 people residing in 596 individual households.

References

External links
UN map of the municipalities of Syangja District

Populated places in Syangja District